Stan Wawrinka defeated Novak Djokovic in the final, 4–6, 6–4, 6–3, 6–4 to win the men's singles tennis title at the 2015 French Open. It was Wawrinka's second major title. As he did when he won the 2014 Australian Open, Wawrinka defeated the world No. 1 and world No. 2 en route to the title. Djokovic was attempting to complete the career Grand Slam.

Rafael Nadal was the five-time defending champion, but lost to Djokovic in the quarterfinals. This was only Nadal's second career defeat at the French Open (the previous one being in 2009 to Robin Söderling) and ended his record win streak at the tournament of 39 matches. Nadal had won all six of his prior matches against Djokovic at the French Open. Nadal fell to world No. 10 in rankings after the loss, his lowest position since April 18, 2005.

Roger Federer was attempting to become the first male player in the Open Era to achieve the double career Grand Slam, but lost to Wawrinka in the quarterfinals.

Seeds

Qualifying

Draw

Finals

Top half

Section 1

Section 2

Section 3

Section 4

Bottom half

Section 5

Section 6

Section 7

Section 8

References 
 
Official Roland Garros 2015 Men's Singles Draw
 Main Draw
2015 French Open – Men's draws and results at the International Tennis Federation

Men's Singles
French Open by year – Men's singles
French Open - Men's Singles